Haplochromis pundamilia is a species of cichlid endemic to the Tanzanian portions of Lake Victoria.  This species can reach a length of  SL.

References

pundamilia
pundamilia
Fish described in 1998
Fish of Tanzania
Fish of Lake Victoria
Taxonomy articles created by Polbot